= Perinkulam =

Village in Kerala, India

Perinkulam is a village in Palakkad district, Kerala, India. Four Main temples constitute an integral part of the custom and tradition of community. The name Perinkulam is derived from a big natural pond situated in front of Shiva Temple, meaning "Perin - Big" and "Kulam -Pond". Each year there is a festival in the month of February, whereby exquisite displays of traditional artifacts are carried throughout the village along with Elephant escorts.
